The Fitch Law Firm is an American law firm based in Columbus, Ohio. The firm's primary focus is personal injury and wrongful death cases.

History
The Fitch Law Firm is located in Columbus, Ohio.

In December 2015, the law firm attorney John Fitch argued in the Ohio Supreme Court to remove the limit on Ohio's non-economic damages for sexually abused minors. The court subsequently upheld the damages cap.

John Fitch
The founder and principal of the firm, John Keith Fitch, is a former president of the Franklin County Trial Lawyers' Association. He is also an active member of various other associations such as the American Association for Justice and the Ohio Association for Justice.

Books and presentations
Product Liability on the Ohio Academy of Trial Lawyers CLE
Personal Injury Litigation on the Columbus Bar Association CLE

References

External links
Official website

Law firms based in Ohio
1980 establishments in Ohio